Sandreani is an Italian surname. Notable people with the surname include:

Alessandro Sandreani (born 1979), Italian footballer and manager, son of Mauro
Mauro Sandreani (born 1954), Italian footballer and manager

Italian-language surnames
Patronymic surnames
Surnames from given names